Grouse Mountain is a mountain in North Vancouver, British Columbia, Canada.

Grouse Mountain may also refer to:

 Grouse Mountain (California), US
 Grouse Mountain, two mountains in Gallatin County, Montana; see List of mountains in Gallatin County, Montana